The Santiago General Cemetery in Santiago, Chile, is one of the largest cemeteries in Latin America with an estimated two million burials. The cemetery was established in 1821 after Chile's independence when Bernardo O'Higgins inaugurated the Alameda de las Delicias along the old course of the Mapocho River. O'Higgins set aside more than 85 hectares of land for the foundation of what became a magnificent grounds filled with ornate mausoleums surrounded by palm and leaf trees set amidst lush gardens and numerous sculptures, which have been estimated be 237. The cemetery, which is located northwest of Cerro Blanco, serves as a true urban park for Santiago located in the municipality of Recoleta.

This cemetery is the final resting place for at least 172 of the most influential people in Chile, including all but two of the deceased Presidents of Chile, the exceptions being Gabriel González Videla and Augusto Pinochet. One of the most visited memorials is that of former President Salvador Allende who had been buried in the Santa Ines cemetery at Viña del Mar following his suicide in the 1973 coup d'état. With the democratic changes that began in the 1990s, Allende was exhumed and his remains were transported in a solemn procession through the streets of Santiago to a place of honor in the Cementerio General de Santiago. The cemetery also has a memorial to the people that were 'disappeared' during the dictatorship of Augusto Pinochet that ousted President Allende.

The gatehouse that serves as the main entrance to the cemetery is crowned by a dome, which acts as a terminating vista for La Paz Avenue. This entrance is preceded by the Plaza La Paz, a semicircular plaza whose curved portion is framed by two exposed brick arcades. At the center of the square stands a monument dedicated to the people who died in the Church of the Company Fire. The cemetery can be accessed via Cementerios metro station.

The historical portion of the cemetery was designated as a national monument in 2010, reaching the same status as Patio 29.

Notable interments
 Salvador Allende (1908–1973), President of Chile
 Arturo Alessandri (1868–1950), President of Chile
 Jorge Alessandri (1896–1986), President of Chile
 Eduardo Frei Montalva (1911–1982), President of Chile
 Eduardo Alquinta (1945–2003), Musician, leader of the Chilean band Los Jaivas
 Patricio Aylwin (1918–2016), President of Chile
 Jaime Guzmán (1946–1991), Senator
 Erich Honecker (1912–1994), General Secretary of the Socialist Unity Party of Germany
 Víctor Jara (1932–1973), poet, folk singer
 Orlando Letelier (1932–1976), statesman
 Carlos Prats (1915–1974), general, statesman
 Violeta Parra (1917–1967), folk singer
 Miguel Enríquez Espinosa (1944–1974), General Secretary of the Revolutionary Left Movement
 Max Westenhofer (1871–1957), German scientist and professor of pathology at the University of Berlin and the University of Chile
 Daniel Zamudio (1987-2012), murder victim

See also 
 Memorial for the Disappeared
 Patio 29

References

External links
 
 

Cemeteries in Chile
Buildings and structures in Santiago
1821 establishments in Chile
Tourist attractions in Santiago, Chile
Parks in Santiago, Chile
National Monuments of Chile